Michael Thomas Moriarty (born March 8, 1974) is an American former professional baseball shortstop and second baseman. He played during one season in Major League Baseball (MLB) for the Baltimore Orioles.

Career
Moriarty was born in Camden, New Jersey and played prep baseball at Bishop Eustace Preparatory School.

He attended Seton Hall University, where he played college baseball for the Pirates under head coach Mike Sheppard. In 1994, he played collegiate summer baseball with the Chatham A's of the Cape Cod Baseball League. He was drafted by the Minnesota Twins in the 7th round of the 1995 MLB Draft.

In . Moriarty was listed as Northeast regional cross-checker on the scouting staff of the Seattle Mariners, based in Marlton, New Jersey.

References

External links

"Mike Moriarty Statistics". The Baseball Cube. 8 January 2008.

1974 births
Living people
American expatriate baseball players in Canada
Altoona Curve players
Baltimore Orioles players
Bishop Eustace Preparatory School alumni
Baseball players from Camden, New Jersey
Chatham Anglers players
Edmonton Trappers players
Fort Myers Miracle players
Fort Wayne Wizards players
Iowa Cubs players
Major League Baseball second basemen
Major League Baseball shortstops
Nashville Sounds players
New Britain Rock Cats players
New Orleans Zephyrs players
Ottawa Lynx players
Pawtucket Red Sox players
Rochester Red Wings players
Salt Lake Buzz players
Seattle Mariners scouts
Syracuse SkyChiefs players
Seton Hall Pirates baseball players